Bellenglise is a commune in the department of Aisne in Hauts-de-France in northern France.

Geography
The village lies close to the N44, in a loop of the St. Quentin Canal, nine kilometres north of St. Quentin.

History
About two kilometres to the north is the Riqueval souterrain.

On the 28 August 1914 the French 10th Regiment of Territorial Infantry opposed a German invading force. The French unit was essentially from the local Département, with its depot in St Quentin. Despite a fierce defence, the French line gave and a battalion (1000 men) of the unit was taken prisoner.

The famous picture of the British 137th Brigade, gathered on the canal bank at Riqueval Bridge, for a pep talk after the crossing of the St. Quentin Canal, was taken nearby.

Population

Sites and monuments
 The commune cemetery, with its military square just to the left of the entrance, where are buried soldiers who died for France.

See also
 Communes of the Aisne department

References

External links 

 Bellenglise on the site of the French National Geographical Institute
 Belenglise church tower on the Clochers (church belfries) site

Communes of Aisne